This page is the discography of the Greek-Georgian pop singer Tamta. It consists of three albums and thirty-two singles, including her Eurovision Song Contest 2019 song "Replay".

Albums

Studio albums

Compilation albums

Extended plays

Singles

As lead artist

As featured artist

Music videos

References

Discographies of Greek artists
Pop music discographies